The canton of Monteux is an administrative division of the Vaucluse department, in southeastern France. It was created at the French canton reorganisation which came into effect in March 2015. Its seat is in Monteux.

It consists of the following communes: 
Althen-des-Paluds 
Beaumes-de-Venise
Caromb
Entraigues-sur-la-Sorgue
Monteux
Saint-Hippolyte-le-Graveyron
Sarrians

References

Cantons of Vaucluse